Ichneutica scutata is a moth of the family Noctuidae. It is endemic to New Zealand. This species can be found in the southern parts of the North Island as well as the eastern parts of the South Island. It is similar in appearance to I. insignis and I. skelloni but can be distinguished as I. scutata is much paler in appearance. It is likely this species inhabits lowland tussock grasslands as well as coastal dunes although it is not common in inland tussock grasslands. The larvae feed on a variety of herbaceous plants such as Plantago and Convolvulus species, Plagianthus divaricatus. It pupates on soil near its host plants. The adults are on the wing from late March to July.

Taxonomy 
This species was described by Edward Meyrick in 1929 from a specimen collected by George Vernon Hudson in winter in Wellington. The male holotype is held at the Natural History Museum, London. In 1988 J. S. Dugdale placed this species within the Graphania genus. In 2019 Robert Hoare undertook a major review of New Zealand Noctuidae species. During this review the genus Ichneutica was greatly expanded and the genus Graphania was subsumed into that genus as a synonym. As a result of this review, this species is now known as Ichneutica scutata.

Description 
Hudson described the grown larvae as follows:

Meyrick described the adult male of the species as follows:

The wingspan of the adult male of this species is between 30 and 39 mm and the wingspan of the female is between 34 and 36.5 mm. Hoare has also assigned a small dark form of this species, found in Mid Canterbury, to this species on the basis of the similarities in the form of antennae, male genitalia and time on the wing. I. scutata is very similar in appearance to I. insignis and I. skelloni but can be distinguished as I. scutata is much paler and the forewing streak is reddish brown in colour in comparison to the black streak of the other two species.

Distribution 
It is endemic to New Zealand. This species is found in the southern parts of the North Island and the eastern side of the South Island.

Habitat 
It has been hypothesised that this species may prefer habitats such as grasslands and open dunes but it does not appear to be common in inland tussock grasslands.

Behaviour 
Adults of this species are on the wing from late March to July.

Life history and host species 

The female of this species lays her eggs in a large cluster with the eggs nearly touching. The larvae feed on various herbaceous plants including grasses, herbs and shrubs. They have been recorded as feeding, either in the wild or when reared, on Plantago and Convolvulus species, Plagianthus divaricatus, Bromus willdenowii and Poa annua. This species pupates in the soil near its host plants.

References

Moths described in 1929
Hadeninae
Moths of New Zealand
Endemic fauna of New Zealand
Taxa named by Edward Meyrick
Endemic moths of New Zealand